Seaqaqa is a town in Fiji. It had a population of 1 008 at the 2012. The town has Seaqaqa F.C., a football club.

References 

Populated places in Fiji
Macuata Province